German submarine U-1230 was a Type IXC/40 U-boat of Nazi Germany's Kriegsmarine during World War II.

Laid down on 15 March 1943 at the Deutsche Werft in Hamburg, and commissioned on 26 January 1944 under the command of Kapitänleutnant Hans Hilbig, it only undertook one patrol, operating from Horten Naval Base, Norway, returning safely to Kristiansand, Norway in early 1945.

Design
German Type IXC/40 submarines were slightly larger than the original Type IXCs. U-1230 had a displacement of  when at the surface and  while submerged. She had two shafts and two  propellers.

U-1230 was fitted with six  torpedo tubes (four fitted at the bow and two at the stern), 22 torpedoes, one  SK C/32 naval gun, 180 rounds, and a  Flak M42 as well as two twin  C/30 anti-aircraft guns. The boat had a complement of forty-eight.

Service history
Its one war patrol was of historical interest less for its role in the Battle of the Atlantic (a Canadian steamer of 5,458 Gross register tonnage was its sole victim), than for its role in transporting two German spies to the United States.

Operation Magpie
William Curtis Colepaugh and Eric Gimpel were landed at Hancock Point in the Gulf of Maine on 29 November 1944 in Operation Elster ("Magpie"). The mission was intended to gather technical intelligence but failed, and both spies were captured.

Fate
At the end of the war it was captured by the Allies, transferred to Loch Ryan in Scotland, and sunk on 17 December 1945 by the Royal Navy frigate  as part of "Operation Deadlight". Unusually for a U-boat, U-1230 does not seem to have suffered any casualties during the war.

Summary of raiding history

References

Bibliography

External links

 ibiblio.org webpage for Allied report on the interrogations of Gimpel and Colepaugh

Captured U-boats
Operation Deadlight
Ships built in Hamburg
German Type IX submarines
U-boats commissioned in 1944
World War II submarines of Germany
1943 ships
U-boats sunk in 1945
Ships sunk as targets
U-boats sunk by British warships
Maritime incidents in December 1945